Glenala State High School is a high school located on Glenala Road in Durack, Brisbane, Queensland, Australia on the border with Inala. It was originally called Inala State High School.

Inala High School serviced the Inala community from 1962 until 1995. The school motto was "Onwards and Upwards".
In 1995–96 Inala High merged with Richlands High, on the original Inala High campus, and was renamed Glenala High. The new school motto was “Believe and Achieve”.

References

Public high schools in Brisbane